Total
 

Raimonds Bergmanis (born 25 July 1966) is a Latvian politician and former Minister of Defence. He is a former Olympic weightlifter and retired strongman competitor.

Athletic career
Bergmanis was part of the Latvian Olympic Weightlifting team, and has set 21 Latvian records. He is a three-time Olympian (1992, 1996 and 2000). In 1992, he carried the Latvian flag at the opening ceremony, the first person to do so since 1936 when independent Latvia last participated in a Summer Olympiad.

Bergmanis had a successful strongman career and was known for his consistency across multiple disciplines, but never managed to win many events outright. He did, however, win the World Muscle Power Championships in 1997, and followed this up with two 2nd place finishes in 1998 and 1999. He also competed in the Arnold's Strongest Man Contest, his best result coming in the 2003 and 2004 competitions where he placed 3rd on both occasions. He also reached the reached the finals in the World's Strongest Man contest several times, finishing 7th in 1996 and 5th in 1997. He competed in the 2001 contest, but was eliminated in the qualifying heats, before producing arguably the best performance of his entire strongman career in the 2002 WSM contest. In what was a hugely talented field, he found himself in 6th place after the first four events. However, by coming 3rd in the Asia Stone - breaking the old world record in the process - and then winning the last two events of the final - the Deadlift and the Atlas Stones - Bergmanis managed to overhaul a deficit to reigning champion Svend Karlsen and held off strong late charges from Juha-Matti Räsänen and Johnny Perry to finish 3rd overall. He then followed this performance by finishing 4th in 2003 and 2004, although the latter was a result of Mariusz Pudzianowski failing a drug test, meaning Bergmanis was promoted from 5th to 4th. He also produced strong showings in several Strongman Superseries events, including setting a new world record of 190kg in the log lift at the 2004 Moscow Superseries event.

After the end of his career, Bergmanis worked in Latvian television and presented a number of programs including "Happy Family" and "The Royal Jokes Tournament" and was commentator for the Latvian Strongman Championships. He was elected as a president of the Latvian Olympic club, and had previously been a board member and vice president. In March 2013, he was elected one of the vice presidents of the Latvian Olympic Committee.

Political career
In 2013 he was elected as one of the vice presidents of the Latvian Olympic Committee. He has worked in the Latvian National Armed Forces.

Bergmanis is a member of the Latvian Green Party, part of the Union of Greens and Farmers political alliance. He was elected to the Latvian parliament in 2014. He became minister of defense in 2015 after his predecessor Raimonds Vējonis was elected President of Latvia.

References

External links
sports-reference

1966 births
Living people
People from Pļaviņas
Latvian Green Party politicians
Ministers of Defence of Latvia
Deputies of the 12th Saeima
Deputies of the 13th Saeima
Deputies of the 14th Saeima
Latvian strength athletes
Latvian male weightlifters
Olympic weightlifters of Latvia
Weightlifters at the 1992 Summer Olympics
Weightlifters at the 1996 Summer Olympics
Weightlifters at the 2000 Summer Olympics
Riga Technical University alumni
Latvian Academy of Sport Education alumni
European Weightlifting Championships medalists